Let's Stay Together may refer to:

Music
 Let's Stay Together (Al Green album), 1972
 "Let's Stay Together" (Al Green song), the title song, also covered by Tina Turner in 1983
 Let's Stay Together (Jimmy McGriff album), 1972, featuring a version of the Al Green song
 Let's Stay Together (Lyfe Jennings song), 2006
 "Let's Stay Together", a song by Ludacris from the 2008 album Theater of the Mind
 "Let's Stay Together", a single by Guy from the 1990 album The Future

Other
 Let's Stay Together (TV series), a BET original series
 "Let's Stay Together" (30 Rock), an episode of 30 Rock
 Let's Stay Together (campaign group), a group which was formed to campaign for a 'no' vote in the 2014 Scottish independence referendum

See also
 Let's Stick Together (disambiguation)